Krasnopol , is a village in Sejny County, Podlaskie Voivodeship, in north-eastern Poland. It is the seat of the gmina (administrative district) called Gmina Krasnopol. The village has a population of 1,300.

Krasnopol was founded in 1770 on the order of Antoni Tyzenhauz in the Opidemie forest on the road from Sejny to Wigry and Suwałki. It was probably granted town privileges in 1782.

See also
 Krasnopol (weapon system)

References

Villages in Sejny County
Suwałki Governorate
Populated places established in 1770